The National Forces' Movement (NEM) was a radical left-wing nationalist party in Hungary, existed between 1993 and 1997.

History
The party was founded on 23 October 1993 from a merger of the Happiness Party (BOP) and the Hungarian Republican Party (MRP). Entrepreneurs György Kassa, Gyula Hernádi and Gergely Walcz were elected co-leaders of the movement. Soon, the Republicans had to leave NEM because it is revealed that its organization was associated with the organized criminal underworld. The MRP was replaced by the Association of Persons Living Below Subsistence Level. The NEM intended to establish the "people-oriented welfare society" and called for new radical political changes by criticizing the Antall government and the opposition parliamentary parties. The NEM also intended to review the rapid privatization.

The NEM contested the 1994 parliamentary election with only one candidate, entrepreneur György Klutsik, who gained 188 votes. Before the 1998 parliamentary election, the NEM joined and merged into the electoral alliance Union for Hungary (EMU) which also failed to win a seat.

Election results

National Assembly

References

Sources

Defunct political parties in Hungary
Political parties established in 1993
Political parties disestablished in 1997
Socialist parties in Hungary
1993 establishments in Hungary
1997 disestablishments in Hungary